Sir Edward Grimwood Mears  (21 January 1869 - 20 May 1963) is best known for his role as secretary of the Dardanelles Commission, for which he received a knighthood, and his later role as a British Chief Justice of the High Court of Judicature at Allahabad, India.

In 1895, he was called to the bar at the Inner Temple. He later gave up his practice at the bar to at first work on the Committee on Alleged German Outrages, which looked at the 1914-15 German atrocities in Belgium and then the Royal Commission on the Easter Rising in Ireland.

Early life and family
Edward Grimwood Mears was born on 21 January 1869, the only son of William Mears of Winchester. He graduated from Exeter College, University of Oxford, in 1893 and two years later was called to the bar at the Inner Temple.

In 1896, he married Annie, daughter of G. P. Jacob of Bryngoleu, Shawford. They had a son, Brigadier-General Gerald Grimwood Mears and a daughter, Isabel, whose son was the noted gastroenterologist, Alex Paton. After the death of his wife Annie in 1943, Mears in 1951 married her cousin, Margaret Tempest, an author and illustrator of children's books.

First World War
At the request of the British government, Mears gave up his practice at the bar to work on the Bryce Commission, also known as the Committee on Alleged German Outrages, which looked at the 1914-15 German atrocities in Belgium. In 1916, he was appointed secretary to the Royal Commission on the Easter Rising in Ireland.

He contributed to the reply to The German White Book. He was appointed secretary of the Dardanelles Commission, and in return received a knighthood. In 1918, he was Lord Reading's assistant on a trip to Washington, when he represented Britain on the inter-allied cereal committee.

High Court of Judicature at Allahabad
In 1919, Mears was appointed Chief Justice of the High Court of Judicature at Allahabad, India. He despised Indian nationalism and during his time in Allahabad, he tried to persuade Jawaharlal Nehru to become education minister for the British government in India.

In India, Mears acted as an intermediary between Irwin and key leaders in the Indian National Congress. He [Mears], was reported to have informed Irwin, of his discussion about India's request for Dominion status at one meeting with Motilal Nehru on 24 March 1929, at the residence of Tej Bahadur Sapru. It was subsequently at Mears' suggestion to Irwin that a round table conference should be convened to discuss the request.

Publications
 "A reply to the German white book on the conduct of the German troops in Belgium". (1916)

References

Further reading
"Royal Commission on the Rebellion in Ireland".1916
"Pandit Moti Lal Nehru"

External links 

 CHAR 2/97 Public and political: correspondence of 1917 concerning the Dardanelles Commission of Inquiry. Churchill Archive
 Dardanelles 1916-19. British History Online
 To deposit the cremated remains of Sir Grimwood Mears, in the closed churchyard, with no memorial stone. National Archives

1869 births
1963 deaths
Chief Justices of the High Courts of India
Alumni of Exeter College, Oxford
English knights
20th-century English judges
English barristers
English justices of the peace
Knights Bachelor
Knights Commander of the Order of the Indian Empire